Pentecostal Maranatha Gospel Church, abbreviated as PMGC was started on Sunday, 9 April 1972 at Pr K.M. George’s (First President) residence near PMG Junction, Thiruvananthapuram, Kerala, India. The first baptism was on 8 April 1972, in which 14 members received water baptism.

References

External links 
 PMGC USA

Churches in Thiruvananthapuram district
Pentecostalism in India
Christian organizations established in 1972
1972 establishments in India
Pentecostal denominations in Asia